Trapani is a city and municipality (comune)  on the west coast of Sicily, in Italy. It is the capital of the Province of Trapani. Founded by Elymians, the city is still an important fishing port and the main gateway to the nearby Egadi Islands.

History

Drepana was founded by the Elymians to serve as the port of the nearby city of Eryx (present-day Erice), which overlooks it from Monte Erice. The city sits on a low-lying promontory jutting out into the Mediterranean Sea.

It was originally named Drépanon from the Greek word for "sickle", because of the curving shape of its harbour. Carthage seized control of the city in 260BC, subsequently making it an important naval base, but ceded it to Rome in 241BC following the Battle of the Aegates in the First Punic War.

Two ancient legends relate supposed mythical origins for the city. In the first legend, Trapani stemmed from the sickle which fell from the hands of the goddess Demeter while she was seeking for her daughter Persephone, who had been kidnapped by Hades. The second myth features Kronos, who eviscerated his father Ouranos, god of the sky, with a sickle which, falling into the sea, created the city. In ancient times, Saturn (i.e., the Punic god Baal Hammon) was the patron god of Trapani. Today, Saturn's statue stands in a piazza in the centre of the city.

After its Roman, Vandal, Ostrogoth, Byzantine and (from 827) Arab conquests, Trapani was taken by the Normans of Roger I in 1077, flourishing under their dominations and having also a role in the Crusades as one of the most important ports in the Mediterranean Sea. In the 17th century, the city decayed due to revolts, plagues, and famines, but in the following century, it grew from 16,000 to 30,000 inhabitants; commerce remained of local importance, while its military position in the Kingdom of Naples remained notable.

The city was badly damaged during World War II, when it was subjected to intense Allied bombardments. It has grown greatly since the end of the war, sprawling out virtually to the foot of Monte San Giuliano. Tourism has grown in recent years due to the city's proximity to popular destinations such as Erice, Segesta, and the Egadi Islands.

Geography

The comune of Trapani consists of two discontiguous parts separated by the comune of Paceco. The northern part includes much of the city and some rural area; the much larger southern part includes the area of Marausa, half of Trapani-Birgi Airport and a large rural area. The comune does not include the north-eastern suburbs of the urban area, such as Casa Santa, which are part of the comune of Erice. The comune of Trapani has a population of 70,000 but the entire urban, including those parts in the comune of Erice, has over 90,000 residents.

Economy
Much of Trapani's economy still depends on the sea and fishing and canning are the main local industries. Coral is also an important export, along with salt, marble, and marsala wine. The nearby coast is lined with numerous saltworks formed by the evaporation of seawater situated majestically along the coast road between Trapani and Marsala.

The city is also an important ferry port, with links to the Egadi Islands, Pantelleria, Sardinia, France and Tunisia. It also has its own airport, the Trapani-Birgi Airport.

Fishing 
Trapani is one of the traditional locations of the mattanza tuna fishing technique, alongside: (San Giuliano, San Cusumano, Isola di Formica, Favignana, Bonagia, San Vito Lo Capo, Scopello, Capo Granitola). Today, this technique is forbidden but the fishing port is very active and hosts 142 small and medium fishing boats, for a total of 2805 GRT (gross tonnage).

The old fish market, renovated in 1998, is now used for cultural events and a new one, large and modern, more functional to fishing activities has been located near the port. It represents the only market in the Province and its recent restructuring, with European funds, places it at the forefront in the national level both in terms of marketing and product traceability.

Coral processing 
Between the fifteenth and sixteenth centuries Trapani fishermen began to practice coral fishing, and coral craftmen started to develop its processing succeeding throughout the Mediterranean. A network of prestigious commissions was consolidated throughout Europe and it was thus possible to produce ever richer and more elaborate works.  Today, however, fishing has almost completely disappeared, while coral processing is limited to few craftsmen.

Saltworks 
Windmills and saltworks are evidence of industrial archeology. Saltworks are located in the area of Natural Reserve of Saline di Trapani and Paceco managed by the WWF and characterized by a remarkable flora and fauna. Thanks to the protection guaranteed by the Reserve, the activity of the saltworkers and the production of salt have increased, favoring the return and reproduction of dozens of species of migratory birds, including the pink flamingo.

Culture
The old city of Trapani dates from the later medieval or early modern periods; there are no more remains of the ancient city and many of the city's historic buildings are designed in the Baroque style. 
 The Church of Sant'Agostino (14th century)
 The Church of Santa Maria di Gesù (15th–16th centuries)
 Basilica-Sanctuary of Maria Santissima Annunziata (also called "Madonna di Trapani") originally built in 1315–1332 and rebuilt in 1760. It houses Museo regionale Agostino Pepoli and a marble statue of the Madonna of Trapani, which might be attributed to the work of Nino Pisano.
 Fontana di Tritone ("Triton's Fountain")
 The Baroque Palazzo della Giudecca  or Casa Ciambra.
 The cathedral (built in 1421, but restored in the 18th century by Giovanni Biagio Amico). It includes a painting of "Annunciation" attributed to Anthony van Dyck.
 Church of Maria SS. dell'Intria, an example of Sicilian Baroque.
 Church of Badia Nuova, a small Baroque church.
 Castello di Terra, a ruined 12th-century castle, today police office.
 Ligny Tower, a 17th-century watchtower housing Phreistory museum.
Regional Museum Agostino Pepoli - Located in the 14th-century Carmelite convent, adjacent to the Sanctuary of Basilica-Sanctuary of Maria Santissima Annunziata, it is one of the most important Sicilian museums. It houses an impressive collection of decorative arts, sculptures (including works by the Gagini), cribs and coral jewelry, and an art gallery that includes, among others, paintings by Titian and Giacomo Balla.
Museum of Prehistory - It is housed inside the seventeenth-century Torre di Ligny, on the extreme western point of the city, and preserves important prehistoric evidence of human presence in the area, as well as finds (artifacts, amphorae, anchors, a Punic helmet) from the sea of Trapani.
Museum of Contemporary Art San Rocco  - Housed inside Palazzo San Rocco, in the historic center.
DiArt, diocesan collection of permanent religious art, housed in the episcopal seminary of Raganzìli in Casa Santa locality.
Diocesan Museum, in the Church of Sant'Agostino
Optical Illusions Museum
Specus Corallii designed by architect Antonino Cardillo

Folklore

The city is renowned for its Easter related Holy Week activities and traditions, culminating between Good Friday and Holy Saturday in the Processione dei Misteri di Trapani, colloquially simply the Misteri di Trapani (in English the Procession of the Mysteries of Trapani or the Mysteries of Trapani), a day-long passion procession organized and sponsored by the city's guilds, featuring twenty floats of wood, canvas and glue sculptures, mostly from the 17th and 18th centuries, of individual scenes of the events of the Passion.

The Misteri are among the oldest continuously running religious events in Europe, having been played every Good Friday since before the Easter of 1612. Running for at least 16 continuous hours, but occasionally well beyond the 24 hours, they are the longest religious festival in Sicily and in Italy. Important also to the cult of the Madonna of Trapani.

The city gives its name to a variety of pesto – pesto alla trapenese – made using almonds instead of the traditional pine nuts in Ligurian pesto.

Transport

Trapani-Birgi Airport is a military-civil joint use airport (third for traffic on the island). Recently the airport has seen an increase of traffic thanks to low-cost carriers from all parts of Europe (i.e. London-Stansted and London-Luton, Paris Beauvais, Dublin, Bruxelles, Munich, Frankfurt, Eindhoven, Stockholm, Malta).

Sport
From September 28 to October 9, 2005, Trapani was the location of Acts 8 and 9 of the Louis Vuitton Cup. This sailing race featured, among other entrants, all the boats that took part in the 2007 America's Cup.

The town is also the base for the local football team Trapani Calcio. Founded in 1905, they are nicknamed the Granata (the Maroons) after their kit colour. In 2010, Trapani Calcio was admitted into the 2010–11 Lega Pro Seconda Divisione (formerly Serie C2), ending the club's 13-year absence from the professional ranks. Subsequently, it made debut in Serie B in the 2013–14 season. It currently plays in Serie B with the coach Fabrizio Castori.

Climate
Trapani has a hot-summer mediterranean climate with hot and dry summers coupled with moderately wet and mild winters. Summer lows are cooler than in other places of Sicily and Calabria, while at the same time remaining significantly warm for several months.

International relations

Twin towns and Sister cities
Trapani is twinned with:
  Constanța, Romania
  Les Sables-d'Olonne, France
  Roquefort-les-Pins, France
  Würselen, Germany

Gallery

See also

 Battle of Drepana
 Drepana

References

Bibliography

External links

 Museum Agostino Pepoli 
 Tuna fisheries
Salt route

 
Coastal towns in Sicily
Municipalities of the Province of Trapani
Sicilian Baroque
Mediterranean port cities and towns in Italy
Phoenician colonies in Sicily
Carthaginian colonies